Eilema voeltzkowi is a moth of the subfamily Arctiinae first described by Per Olof Christopher Aurivillius in 1909. It is found on Madagascar.

References

Moths described in 1909
voeltzkowi